The 2009 Formul'Academy Euro Series season was the seventeenth season of the series for 1600cc Formula Renault machinery, and the second under the Formul'Academy Euro Series guise. The season began on 3 May at Circuit Ricardo Tormo in Valencia, Spain and ended on 25 October at Ciudad del Motor de Aragón in Alcañiz, also in Spain; and consisted of fourteen races at seven meetings. Benjamin Bailly became series champion, only the fourth time that a non-French driver had won the series that began as Formula Renault Campus.

Driver lineup

Race calendar and results
 A seven-round calendar was announced on 12 January 2009.

Championship standings

Drivers
 Only a driver's best twelve results counted towards the championship. Points were awarded to the drivers as follows:

References

External links
 The official website of the Formul'Academy Euro Series 

Formul'Academy
Formul'Academy